Tauhinu is the Māori name for at least two different species of plants native to New Zealand: 

Ozothamnus leptophyllus, a common colonising native shrub.
Pomaderris phylicifolia, an endangered colonising plant.

References

Flora of New Zealand